Khaled Ben Slimene  (born ) is a Tunisian male volleyball player. He was part of the Tunisia men's national volleyball team at the 2014 FIVB Volleyball Men's World Championship in Poland. He played for CO Kelibia.

He competed at the 2020 Summer Olympics.

Clubs
 CO Kelibia (2014)

References

External links

1994 births
Living people
Tunisian men's volleyball players
Place of birth missing (living people)
Volleyball players at the 2020 Summer Olympics
Olympic volleyball players of Tunisia